August Hauner (29 October 1811 – 11 June 1884) was a German pediatrician and founder of the Dr. von Haunerschen Kinderspitals (Hauner Children's Hospital) in Munich, which today is part of the University of Munich hospital complex. He was born in Neumarkt-Sankt Veit.

He studied medicine at the Universities of Munich and Vienna, and in 1837 relocated to Tann, Bavaria as a general practitioner. Later, he performed similar duties in Murnau am Staffelsee. In 1845 he moved to Munich, where he opened a small private hospital for treatment of underprivileged sick children. The original facility had six hospital beds with a busy out-patient clinic. Gradually, over the years, the hospital grew in size and stature.

In 1850 he obtained his habilitation at Munich, and began teaching clinical courses in pediatrics. In 1853 he was made an "honorary professor" with no entitlement to a salary. In 1882 a new hospital building was constructed on the Lindwurmstraße, two years prior to his death.

Written works 
Beginning in 1852, he was co-editor of Behrend's Journal für Kinderkrankheiten, a journal in which he published extensively on his experiences in pediatrics. He was the author of the following works in pediatrics:
 Beiträge zur Paediatrik (1863); (Contributions to pediatrics).
 Grundzüge der physischen Erziehung der Kinder (1868); (Principles of physical education for children).

References 
 Translated biography @ Allgemeine Deutsche Biographie

1811 births
1884 deaths
People from Mühldorf (district)
German pediatricians
Academic staff of the Ludwig Maximilian University of Munich
Burials at the Alter Südfriedhof